Mem (also spelled Meem, Meme, or Mim) is the thirteenth letter of the Semitic abjads, including Hebrew mēm , Aramaic Mem , Syriac mīm ܡ, Arabic mīm  and Phoenician mēm .

The Phoenician letter gave rise to the Greek mu (Μ), Etruscan  , Latin M, and  Cyrillic М.

Origins
Mem is believed to derive from the Egyptian hieroglyphic symbol for water, N35 which had been simplified by the Phoenicians and named after their word for “water”, mem, ultimately coming from Proto-Semitic *maʾ-/*may-.

Hebrew Mem

Hebrew spelling:

Hebrew pronunciation
Mem represents a bilabial nasal .

Variations on written form/pronunciation

Significance
In gematria, Mem represents the number 40 in both the Standard and Mispar Gadol Methods of Gematria; However, (mem sofit) final mem's value is 40 in the Standard Method and 600 in the Mispar Gadol method. The Standard Method adds the values of Tav and Resh (400+200) to denote the value of mem sofit.

In the Sefer Yetzirah, the letter Mem is King over Water, Formed Earth in the Universe, Cold in the Year, and the Belly in the Soul.

As an abbreviation, it stands for metre. In the Israeli army it can also stand for mefaked, commander. In Hebrew religious texts, it can stand for the name of God Makom, the Place.

Mem and Tarot
Mem is associated with The Hanged Man (Atu XII), the element of water and the path between Geburah and Hod on the Tree of Life.

Arabic mīm

The letter is named , and is written in several ways depending on its position in the word:

Some examples on its uses in Modern Standard Arabic:

Mīm is used in the creation of ism words (i.e. nouns and adjectives; they are treated fundamentally the same in Arabic grammar). Specifically,  is used in the creation of the masdar (verbal noun) of Stem III verbs (the masdar of verbs on the pattern fāʿala is mufāʿala), of subject and object nouns for verbs of Stems II-X (using the example of Stem II, subject nouns—called fāʿil words because of their form in Stem I—are mufaʿʿil for verbs of Stems II-X, and object nouns—called mafʿūl also because of their Stem I form—take the form mufaʿʿal for verbs of Stems II-X).

Syriac mim

Character encodings

See also
Nun (letter)

External links

Phoenician alphabet
Arabic letters
Hebrew letters
Letters with final form